A Quonset hut  is a lightweight prefabricated structure of corrugated galvanized steel having a semi cylindrical cross-section. The design was developed in the United States, based on the Nissen hut introduced by the British during World War I. Hundreds of thousands were produced during World War II and military surplus was sold to the public. The name comes from the site of their first deployment at Quonset Point at the Davisville Naval Construction Battalion Center in Davisville, Rhode Island.

Design and history 
The first Quonset huts were manufactured in 1941 when the United States Navy needed an all-purpose, lightweight building that could be shipped anywhere and assembled without skilled labor. The George A. Fuller construction company manufactured them, and the first was produced within 60 days of signing the contract. In 1946, the Great Lakes Steel Corporation claimed "the term 'Quonset,' as applied to builders and building materials, is a trade mark owned by the Great Lakes Steel Corporation." But the word is often used generically. Today similar structures are made by many contractors in countries around the world.

The original design was a  structure framed with steel members with an  radius. Other sizes were developed, including  and  warehouse models.

The sides were corrugated steel sheets, and the two ends were covered with plywood which had doors and windows. The interior was insulated and had pressed wood lining and a wood floor. The building could be placed on concrete, on pilings, or directly on the ground with a wood floor. The original design used low-grade steel, which was later replaced by a more rust-resistant version. The flexible interior space was open, allowing use as barracks, latrines, medical and dental offices, isolation wards, housing, and bakeries.

Between 150,000 and 170,000 Quonset huts were manufactured during World War II, and the military sold its surplus huts to the public after the war. Many remain standing throughout the United States as outbuildings, businesses, or even homes, and they are often seen at military museums and other places featuring World War II memorabilia. Many were also used around the United States for temporary postwar housing, such as Rodger Young Village for veterans and their families in Los Angeles, California, and the Quonset Park complex of married student housing at the University of Iowa. Some are still in active use at United States military bases. The U.S. Department of Energy continues to utilize Quonset huts as supporting structures (fabrication and machine shops, warehouses, etc.) at the Nevada National Security Site.

See also 
 Daniel House (Knoxville, Tennessee)
 Dymaxion deployment unit
 Iris hut
 Jamesway hut
 Longhouses of the indigenous peoples of North America
 Romney hut
 Patera Building

References

External links 

 Feature article on the design and origin of the Quonset Hut from the Varnum Continentals historical organization in East Greenwich, RI. 
 Archived History of Quonset Hut from the U.S. Naval History and Heritage Command website.
 Quonset Hut History in Washington State . Washington State Department of Archaeology & Historic Preservation.
 Quonset Huts at Guampedia, Guam's Online Encyclopedia
 Quonset Huts, At National Airport, Arlington, Arlington County, VA at the Historic American Buildings Survey (HABS)
 Quonset and Pacific Huts at the Kodiak Military History Museum
 Pacific Huts at the online encyclopedia of Washington State History
 Quonset Hut (search Pacific Hut Company) at the Seabee Museum and Memorial Park

Huts
Iron and steel buildings
Portable buildings and shelters
Barracks
Prefabricated houses
Military equipment of World War II
Architecture in the United States